John Fryer (born 1958) is an English record producer. Best known for his production work, he has also performed as a musician, as one of the two constant members of This Mortal Coil (along with Ivo Watts-Russell), providing keyboards, strings and synthesizer sequencing for the band, and its offshoot, The Hope Blister.

Career 
Fryer started out at Blackwing Studios in south London, working with bands on the 4AD, Mute, Rough Trade and Beggars Banquet record labels, including Depeche Mode, Fad Gadget and Cocteau Twins. His work with the Cocteau Twins, helping to develop their ethereal and ambient sound, led Watts-Russell to recruit Fryer as his musical and producing partner for This Mortal Coil.

Fryer is also known for his production work in the industrial rock genre, working with Nine Inch Nails, Stabbing Westward and Gravity Kills. He worked with the Italian band Dope Stars Inc on their debut album, Neuromance.
He also produced, engineered and mixed The Schools Espionage, which was nominated for a Norwegian Grammy (Spellemannsprisen, the rock category), and mixed the US breakthrough album for Jesus Jones, Doubt. More recently, Fryer has also started his own label, Something To Listen To.

In early 2010, Fryer began collaborating with Stripmall Architecture vocalist Rebecca Coseboom under the name Dark Drive Clinic. The pair released their debut album, Noise in My Head, in October 2011.

In 2013 Fryer formed the band Silver Ghost Shimmer with Pinky Turzo, and their debut album Soft Landing was released on 1 May 2015. In 2014 Fryer started collaborating with Louise Fraser in the band Muricidae, which released two EPs in 2015, "Tales From A silent Ocean" and "Tears Are Stronger Than Waves". In 2016 Fryer launched a music project named Black Needle Noise, collaborating with a vocalists from many genres of popular music, including Jarboe (Swans), Ledfoot, Elena Alice Fossi of Kirlian Camera, Betsy Martin of Caterwaul, Bill Leeb (Front Line Assembly, Delerium), Mimi Page, Jennie Vee, Sivert Høyem and Beca.

In February 2018, the single "I Am You" was released by No Devotion Records on a limited edition 7" vinyl, including remixes by The Blue Hour and Dave Parley from the band Prayers. It also has vocals from Bill Leeb and Tara Busch.

Discography

Soundtracks 
 Clerks (1994)
 Seven (1995)
 Mortal Kombat (?)
 Johnny Mnemonic (1995)
 Mortal Kombat: More Kombat (1996)
 Faust (2001)
 Resident Evil: Apocalypse (2004)
You Know The Way / Get Out 2019

 Albums 
 Noise In My Head (2011) — as DarkDriveClinic
 Noise In My Head reMix Album Part 1 (2012) — as DarkDriveClinic

 As Producer 

 Fad Gadget - Fireside Favorites (1980) 
 Dome - Dome (1980)
 Dome - Dome 2 (1980)
 BC Gilbert / G Lewis - 3R4 (1980) 
 Dome - Dome 3 (1981)
 Fad Gadget - Incontinent (1981)
 Depeche Mode - Speak & Spell (1981)
 Yazoo - Upstairs at Eric's (1982)
 BC Gilbert / G Lewis / Russell Mills - MZUI (1982) 
 Depeche Mode - A Broken Frame (1982)
 Cocteau Twins - Head Over Heels (1983)
 Cocteau Twins - Sunburst and Snowblind (1983) 
 Depeche Mode - Construction Time Again (1983)
 Xmal Deutschland - Fetisch (1983) 
 Duet Emmo - Or So It Seems (1983) 
 Play Dead - From The Promised Land (1984)
 This Mortal Coil - It'll End in Tears (1984) 
 Xmal Deutschland - Tocsin (1984)
 Modern English - Ricochet Days (1984) 
 Bruce Gilbert - This Way (1984) 
 The Wolfgang Press - Legendary Wolfgang Press and Other Tall Stories (1985) 
 Frank Tovey - Fad Gadget Singles (1985)
 Clan of Xymox - Clan of Xymox [Bonus Tracks] (1985)
 Fad Gadget - Fad Gadget Singles (1985)
 This Mortal Coil - Filigree & Shadow (1986)
 The Wolfgang Press - Standing Up Straight (1986) 
 Peter Murphy - Should the World Fail to Fall Apart (1986) 
 He Said - Hail (1986)
 Bruce Gilbert - The Shivering Man (1986)
 The Weathermen - The Black Album According To The Weathermen (1987) 
 Swans - Children of God (1987)
 Various Artists - Lonely Is an Eyesore (1987)
 M/A/R/R/S - Pump Up the Volume (Remix) (1987)
 Minimal Compact - Figure One Cuts (1987)
 Clan of Xymox - Medusa [Bonus Tracks] (1987)
 Breathless - Three Times and Waving (1987)
 Alison Moyet - Raindancing (1987)
 Fields of the Nephilim - Dawnrazor (1987)
 Bruce Gilbert - This Way to the Shivering Man (1987)
 BC Gilbert / G Lewis - 8 Time (1988)
 He Said - Take Care (1988)
 Wire - It's Beginning to and Back Again (1989)
 A.C. Marias - One of Our Girls (1989)
 Love and Rockets - Love and Rockets [Compilation] (1989)
 Various Artists - Very Special Christmas (1989)
 Hugh Harris - Words for Our Years (1989)
 Clan of Xymox - Clan of Xymox [Import] (1989)
 Love and Rockets - Love and Rockets (1989)
 Nine Inch Nails - Pretty Hate Machine (1989)
 Easy - Magic Seed (1990)
 Various Artists - Indie Top 20, Vol. 9 (1990)
 His Name Is Alive - Livonia (1990)
 Breathless - Chasing Promises (1990)
 Moev - Head Down (1990)
 Pale Saints - The Comforts of Madness (1990)
 Depeche Mode - Singles Box 2 (1991)
 Cath Carroll - England Made Me (1991)
 Wire - The Drill (1991)
 Jesus Jones - Doubt (1991) 
 This Mortal Coil - Blood (1991)
 Alison Moyet - Hoodoo (1991)
 Various Artists - Nettwerk Sampler, Vol. 3 (1991)
 Chapterhouse - Whirlpool (1991)
 His Name Is Alive - Home Is in Your Head [Rykodisc] (1991)
 Depeche Mode - Singles Box 1 (1991)
 Invisible Limits - familiar! (1991)
 Play Dead - Resurrection (1992)
 The Beautiful - Storybook (1992)
 Sex Gang Children - Blind (1992)
 Swallow - Blow (1992)
 Stabbing Westward - Ungod (1993)
 Robert Wyatt - Mid-Eighties (1993)
 Die Krupps - Tribute to Metallica [Bonus Tracks] (1993)
 Play Dead - First Flower (1993)
 Various Artists - Cyber Core Compilation (1994)
 Breathless - Heartburst (1995)
 Various Artists - Sharks Patrol These Waters (1995)
 Die Krupps - Metalmorphosis of Die Krupps: 81–92 (1996)
 Stabbing Westward - Wither Blister Burn & Peel (1996)
 Gravity Kills - Gravity Kills (1996)
 Love and Rockets - Sweet F.A. (1996)
 White Zombie - Supersexy Swingin' Sounds (1996)
 Pink Noise Test - Plasticized (1997)
 Various Artists - Before X (1997)
 Gravity Kills - Manipulated (1997)
 Radio Iodine - Tiny Warnings (1997)
 Course of Empire - Telepathic Last Words (1998)
 Messiah - Messiah Meets Progenitor (1998)
 Depeche Mode - Singles 81>85 (1998)
 Love in Reverse - Words Become Worms (1998)
 Depeche Mode - Singles Box, Vol. 3 [Import CD][Limited Edition] (1998)
 P'O - Whilst Climbing Thieves Vie for Attention (1998)
 Various Artists - Anakin (1998)
 The Hope Blister - ...smile's ok (1998)
 Depeche Mode - Singles Box, Vol. 2 [Import CD][Limited Edition] (1998)
 Various Artists - Postpunk Chronicles: Left of the Dial (1999)
 The Hope Blister - Underarms (1999)
 Yazoo - Best of Yazoo (1999)
 Fields of the Nephilim - Dawnrazor [Bonus Track] (1999)
 Various Artists - 1980's New Wave (1999)
 Cradle of Filth - From the Cradle to Enslave (1999)
 Instrumental - Acoustek (2000)
 Various Artists - Dr. Wu 2000 (2000)
 Groundswell UK - Corrode (2000)
 Dome - Yclept (2000)
 Cradle of Filth - Midian (2000)
 HIM - Razorblade Romance (2000)
 Sex Gang Children - Complete Sex Gang Children (2000)
 Various Artists - Rough Trade Shops: 25 Years (2001)
 Gwenmars - Driving A Million (2001)
 Sex Gang Children - Fall: The Complete Singles (2001)
 HIM - Deep Shadows and Brilliant Highlights [Bonus Tracks] (2001)
 Raging Speedhorn - Raging Speedhorn [UK Bonus Tracks] (2001)
 Paradise Lost - Believe in Nothing (2001)
 The Wolfgang Press - Everything Is Beautiful: 1983–1995 (2001)
 Various Artists - Modern Sound Files (2001)
 Fad Gadget - Best of Fad Gadget (2001)
 Lush - Ciao! 1989–1996 (2001)
 HIM - The Single Collection (2002)
 Cradle of Filth - Lovecraft & Witch Hearts (2002)
 Jesus Jones - Never Enough: Best Of (Remastered) (2002)
 The Go-Betweens - Spring Hill Fair (2002)
 HIM - Deep Shadows and Brilliant Highlights (2002)
 Love and Rockets - Sorted!: The Best of Love and Rockets (2003)
 Various Artists - Cradle of Fear (2003)
 Stabbing Westward - Essential Stabbing Westward (2003)
 Cocteau Twins - Stars And Topsoil: A Collection 1982–1990 (Remastered) (2003)
 Various Artists - Feedback to the Future (2003)
 Various Artists - This Is Electroclash (2003)
 Breathless - Glass Bead Game (Eng) (2003)
 Gilbert/Lewis/Mills - Mzui (2003)
 HIM - And Love Said No: The Greatest Hits 1997-2004 (2004)
 Depeche Mode - Singles Box 4 (2004)
 Various Artists - MTV2 Headbangers Ball, Vol. 2 (2004)
 NON - Terra Incognita (2004)
 Depeche Mode - Singles Box 3 (2004)
 Various Artists - Louder Than the Crowd (2004)
 Depeche Mode - Remixes 81-04 (2004)
 Various Artists - Hurry Home Early: The Songs of Warren Zevon (2005)
 Ewigkeit - Conspiritus (2005)
 The Hope Blister - Underarms & Sideways (2005)
 Jarboe - Mystery of Faith (2005)
 Esoterica - The Fool (2005)
 Dope Stars Inc. - Neuromance (2005)
 Colt - These Things Can't Hurt You Now So Throw Them in the Fire (2005)
 Cradle of Filth - Cradle of Filth Box Set (2006)
 Cocteau Twins - Lullabies to Violaine (2006)
 Various Artists - Life Less Lived: The Gothic Box (2006)
 Cocteau Twins - Lullabies To Violaine: Singles & Extended Plays 1 (2006)
 Lacrimas Profundere - Filthy Notes for Frozen Hearts (2006)
 HIM - Uneasy Listening Vol. 1 (2006)
 Nitzer Ebb - Body of Work 1984–1997 (Bonus Cd) (Rmxs) (2006)
 Hermine - Lonely at the Top + Extras (2006)
 Various Artists - 80's Dance Gold (Rmst) (2006)
 De/Vision - Best of De/Vision (2006)
 Depeche Mode - Best of Depeche Mode, Vol. 1 [CD/DVD] (2006)
 Sundealers - Tears, Love, Religion (2006)
 Everything on Black - Stain (2006)
 The School - Espionage (2006)
 LICKY - Press Fire To Continue (2006)
 Rabia Sorda - Metodos Del Caso (2006)
 Ranheim - Rock & Science (2006)
 Various Artists - From Brussels With Love (Rmst) (2007)
 Angels & Agony - Unison (2007)
 Alucard - Cold (2007)
 Ashbury Heights - Three Cheers for the Newlydeads (2007)
 DeathBoy - End of an Error (2007)
 [[Din{A}Tod]] - The Sound of Crash (2007)
 Lacrimas Profundere - Songs for the last view (2008)
 Ashbury Heights - Morningstar in a Black Car (2008)
 Alucard - Dark Romantism (2009)
 Rabia Sorda - Noise Diary (2009)
 Ronni Le Tekrø and Augustin Granados - Social Experiment (2011)
 Ulver - Wars of the Roses (2011)
 Dark Drive Clinic Noise in My Head (2011)
 Orient Xpress - Escape (2011)
 Project Paperclip - The Veritable Path (2012)
 Bruno Ferrari (Czech new wave project) - Vaudeville (2012)
 Vanessa (Czech EBM/Industrial band) - Antidotum (2013)
 The Foreign Resort - New Frontiers (2014)
 Randolph's Grin - Dragon Road (2015)
 Mortal Cabinet - Necrotica (2015)
 Angels & Agony - Monument (2015)
 Wintry - " Ausweg " (2017)
 FAKEBA - System Bi (2017)
 No Devotion Records- "I am you" (2018)
 Palais Ideal. - Pressure Points (2019)
 616 - One Way To Love (2019)
 616 - Cinderella Valentine featuring Bam Margera and Gas Lipstick of "HIM" (2020)
Maheekats - Money Bunny (2020)
 FAKEBA - JOTNA (2020)
 Eden Rayne - Lost In Artificial Reality-Fall (2021)
 The Acharis - Blue Sky/Grey Heaven'' (2021)

References

External links 
 
 From 4AD To Nine Inch Nails

1958 births
Living people
English record producers
Dream pop musicians
English songwriters
This Mortal Coil members